Ekundayo B. Opaleye was Governor of Ondo State, Nigeria from August 1986 to December 1987 during the military regime of general Ibrahim Babangida.

Military career

Colonel Opaleye was a member of a Special Military Tribunal set up in 1986 to try officers accused of plotting a coup against Babangida in December 1985.
In August 1986 he was appointed governor of Ondo State, holding office until December 1987. 
General Opaleye was appointed commander of the OAU Neutral Military Organization Group (NMOG) set up in 1991 to enforce a cease fire between the Tutsi-led Rwandan Patriotic Front (RPF) and the Hutu-dominated Rwandan government. NMOG had the limited mandate of creating a buffer zone between the rebels and the government troops.
In 1993 NMOG was integrated into the United Nations Assistance Mission for Rwanda (UNAMIR).
Major-general Opaleye played a big role in the conclusion of the ARUSHA talks that let to the Peace Agreement signed on August 4, 1993.

Later career

After retiring from the army, Opaleye was made an Owu Erunmu chief (Balogun Erunmu – Erunmu Owu's highest ranking war chieftain) by the Oluroko of Erunmu Owu, Honourable Chief Aremu Olugbolahan Ijaola. This makes him a traditional war chief in Erunmu, and by extension, a secondary cabinet member in the Owu Kingdom.
He was involved in controversy when the Owu monarch, Oba Adegboyega Dosumu, appointed sixteen new Obas, whom the Ogun State government refused to recognize. In October 2009 Opaleye said the Owu Kingdom would not reverse the appointments since they were not contrary to any laws.

References 

Nigerian generals
People from Ondo State
Living people
Yoruba military personnel
Governors of Ondo State
Year of birth missing (living people)